1964 in professional wrestling describes the year's events in the world of professional wrestling.

List of notable promotions 
Only one promotion held notable shows in 1964.

Calendar of notable live events

Notable events
March  Dick the Bruiser and Wilbur Snyder opened the World Wrestling Association professional wrestling promotion based out of Indianapolis, Indiana.

Accomplishments and tournaments

EMLL

Championship changes

EMLL

NWA

Debuts
Debut date uncertain:
Alberto Muñoz
Johnny Rodz
Joyce Grable
Paul Jones
Thunderbolt Patterson
May 6  Jimmy Valiant
October 31  The Great Kabuki
November  Kendo Nagasaki

Births
Date of birth uncertain:
Doug Flex 
January 1  Mick Tierney 
January 4:
Riki Takeuchi
J. T. Southern
January 6:
Jacqueline
Konnan
January 13  Zuleyma
January 14  Ernest Miller 
January 19  Sonny Blaze
February 3  Pantera
February 5  Poison Julie Sawada
February 7  Ron Hutchison
February 9  Madusa
February 14  Ken Shamrock
February 16  Shunji Takano
February 18  Tim Storm
February 19  Botswana Beast 
March 2  Mike Von Erich(died in 1987) 
March 3  Glenn Kulka 
March 9  Koki Kitahara
March 14  Bryan Clark
March 16  Henry O. Godwinn
March 22  El Felino
March 31  Fez Whatley (died in 2021) 
April 10  EZ Ryder
April 11  Takahiro Takigawa
April 14  Brian Adams(died in 2007)
April 18  Brick Bronsky (died in 2021) 
April 20  Big Guido 
May 6  Brian Knobbs
May 13  Glacier
May 17  Woman(died in 2007)
May 22  Marcus Dupree 
May 31  Randy Mulkey
June 18  Big Vito
June 23  Mosco de la Merced
July 2:
Charles Robinson
Joe Gomez 
Hisakatsu Oya 
July 3  Jack Victory 
July 5  Jerry Sags
July 6  Rick Patterson 
August 1  Prince Iaukea
August 10  Savio Vega
August 19  Toni Adams (d. 2010)
August 20  Tori
August 23  TARU
August 28:
The Colorado Kid
John Cozman (died in 2016) 
September 2  Skayde
September 5  Emmanuel Yarbrough (died in 2015) 
September 8  Raven
September 20  Scott Hudson 
October 6  Dixie Carter
October 9  Rockin' Robin
October 26  Nicole Bass (died in 2017) 
October 30  Shinobu Kandori 
October 31  The Boogeyman (wrestler)
November 13  Mike Samples
November 21: 
Shane Douglas
Tsuyoshi Kikuchi 
November 30  Jushin Thunder Liger
December 7  Curtis Hughes
December 8  Chigusa Nagayo
December 12  Sabu
December 18  Stone Cold Steve Austin
December 20  Mark Coleman
December 23  Swoll

Deaths
February 12 - Al Pierotti, 68
May 9  Erik Malmberg 67
September 11  Karol Kalmikoff 51
October 2  Larry Chene, 40
October 22  Tom Packs, 70

References

 
professional wrestling